Ralph Weldon (baptised 1606 – 1676) was an English politician who sat in the House of Commons  from 1654 to 1656. He fought in the Parliamentary army in the English Civil War.

Weldon was the son of Sir Anthony Weldon of Swanscombe, Kent. He was admitted at Jesus College, Cambridge on 24 November 1620. He became a commander in the Parliamentary Army at Taunton, Somerset, and took part in the siege of Bristol in 1645. He gave up his command to become Governor of Plymouth in 1645.

References

Military personnel from Kent
1606 births
1676 deaths
Alumni of Jesus College, Cambridge
People from Swanscombe
English MPs 1640–1648
English MPs 1654–1655
English MPs 1656–1658
Parliamentarian military personnel of the English Civil War